Henry Merritt Wriston (July 4, 1889 – March 8, 1978) was an American educator, presidential advisor, and served as president at both Brown University and Lawrence University.

Early life
Henry Merritt Wriston was born in Laramie, Wyoming, the son of a Methodist minister and a schoolteacher. He received his BA in 1911 from Wesleyan University and returned there for his MA, which he earned in 1912. While an undergraduate at Wesleyan, he edited the school newspaper, was a top debater, and won the senior oratorical contest.

He began graduate studies in history and international affairs at Harvard University as an Austin Teaching Fellow, and returned to Wesleyan in 1914 as a history instructor. During World War I, Wriston was the assistant manager of the Connecticut State Council of Defense, and given his success there, he was appointed to be the executive secretary of the Wesleyan Endowment Fund in 1919. In 1922, Wriston completed his dissertation and was awarded his PhD from Harvard, and was consequently awarded full professor status at Wesleyan.

University president
Due in large part to his role with Wesleyan's Endowment Fund, the Lawrence College (now Lawrence University) Board of Trustees selected him to be their next president, replacing Samuel G. Plantz, who had died the year prior, and interim president Wilson Samuel. Wriston was the eighth president of Lawrence University, and held the position from 1925 to 1937. His term was marked by the improvement of the curriculum, faculty, and library collections, and the establishment of the Institute of Paper Chemistry (now the Institute of Paper Science and Technology). Before leaving the school, he wrote the book The Nature of a Liberal College.

He was president of Brown University between 1937 and 1955. Following a change in the university's charter, he was the first president who was not a Baptist minister in the 175 years of the college; he was also the first president since Francis Wayland who was not an alum.

Later life
He served as president of the Council on Foreign Relations between 1951 and 1964. He also served as president of the American Assembly until 1963 and served on the board of trustees of the World Peace Foundation.

In 1961, President Dwight D. Eisenhower appointed Wriston to the Chairmanship of the President's Commission on National Goals. Wriston was also an adviser to President Eisenhower, a member of the United States Department of State's Advisory Committee on Foreign Service, and chairman of the Historical Advisory Committee to the Chief of Military History for the United States Department of the Army.

He is the father of Walter Wriston, former chairman and CEO of Citibank. Wriston died on March 8, 1978, in New York City, aged 88.

Works
 "Academic Procession." New York: New York University Press,  1959.
 "Challenge to Freedom," New York: Harper, 1943.
 "Character in Action." Providence: Brown University Press, 1941.
 "College Students and the War" Washington D.C.: The National Policy Committee,  1940.
 "Cuba and the United States: long range perspectives" Washington: Brookings Institution, 1967.
 "Diplomacy in a Democracy," New York: Harper, 1956.
 "Education for Democracy." Boston: American Unitarian Association, 1940.
 "Executive Agents in American foreign relations." Baltimore: The Johns Hopkins Press, 1929.
 "How to Achieve the Inevitable." Providence: Brown University Press, 1943.
 "The Nature of a Liberal College," Appleton, Wisconsin: Lawrence College Press, 1937.
 "Policy Perspectives," Providence: Brown University Press, 1964.
 "Prepare for Peace!" New York: Harper, 1941.
 "Strategy of Peace" Boston: World Peace Organization,  1944.
 "Voices of America" Stamford, Connecticut. Overbrook Press, 1953.
 "Washington's Foreign Policy as a Guide for Today." Middletown Connecticut: Press of Pelton & King, 1925.
 "Wriston speaking:  A selection of addresses." Providence: Brown University Press, 1957.

References

External links
 
 Lawrence's Portrait of Henry Merritt Wriston
 Short bio of Wriston from Brown University
 The American Assembly
 A collection of writings and speeches given by Henry Merritt Wriston
 Henry Wriston interviewed by Mike Wallace on The Mike Wallace Interview August 17, 1958

1889 births
1978 deaths
American educational theorists
Harvard Graduate School of Arts and Sciences alumni
Presidents of the Council on Foreign Relations
Presidents of Brown University
Presidents of Lawrence University
Wesleyan University alumni
20th-century American non-fiction writers
20th-century American academics